Crête is a surname of French origin. Some persons with the surname include:

 Joseph-Alphida Crête (1890–1964), Canadian politician
 Martin Crête (born 1985), Canadian curler
 Paul Crête (born 1953), Canadian politician
 Stéphane Crête (born 1967), Canadian actor and comedian

See also
 Crête Sèche (disambiguation)